Seventeen or 17 may refer to:

17 (number), the natural number following 16 and preceding 18
 one of the years 17 BC, AD 17, 1917, 2017

Literature

Magazines
Seventeen (American magazine), an American magazine
Seventeen (Japanese magazine), a Japanese magazine

Novels
Seventeen (Tarkington novel), a 1916 novel by Booth Tarkington
Seventeen (Sebuntiin), a 1961 novel by Kenzaburō Ōe
Seventeen (Serafin novel), a 2004 novel by Shan Serafin

Stage and screen

Film
Seventeen (1916 film), an American silent comedy film
Number Seventeen, a 1932 film directed by Alfred Hitchcock
Seventeen (1940 film), an American comedy film
Eric Soya's '17' (Danish: Sytten), a 1965 Danish comedy film
Seventeen (1985 film), a documentary film
17 Again (film), a 2009 film whose working title was 17
Seventeen (2019 film), a Spanish drama film

Television
Seventeen (TV drama), a 1994 UK dramatic short starring Christien Anholt
"Seventeen" (The Killing), a 2013 episode of the American television drama series The Killing

Theatre
 Number 17 (play), a 1925 work by the British writer Joseph Jefferson Farjeon
 Seventeen (musical), a 1951 Broadway musical based on Booth Tarkington's novel

Music

Albums
Seventeen (Keisha White album), and the title song 2007
Seventeen (Iris album), 2012
17 (Motel album), and the title song
17 (Ricky Martin album), 2008
17 (Tokio album), 2012
17 (XXXTentacion album), 2017
17 (EP), by Zhavia Ward, 2019

Songs
"17" (MK song), a 2017 song by Marc Kinchen
"17" (Madame song), a 2019 song by Madame
"17", a 2020 song by Pink Sweats
"17", by Avril Lavigne from Avril Lavigne
"17", by Cross Canadian Ragweed from Cross Canadian Ragweed
"17", by Hedley from Cageless
"17", by Kings of Leon from Only by the Night
"17", by Mandy Moore from Mandy Moore
"17", by Milburn from Well Well Well
"17", by Rick James from Reflections
"17", by Sky Ferreira
"17", by The Smashing Pumpkins from Adore
"17", by Yourcodenameis:Milo from Ignoto
"17", by Youth Lagoon from The Year of Hibernation
"At Seventeen", Janis Ian song
"Seventeen" (Alessia Cara song), from Four Pink Walls
"Seventeen" (Boyd Bennett song), a 1955 popular song
"Seventeen" by Bobby Brown from King of Stage
"Seventeen" (Jet song), 2010
"Seventeen" (Ladytron song), 2002
"Seventeen" (Marina and the Diamonds song) from Mermaid Vs. Sailor EP
"Seventeen" (Simon Webbe song), from Grace
"Seventeen" (Winger song), 1988
"Seventeen", by The Elders from American Wake
"Seventeen", by ¡Forward, Russia! from Give Me a Wall
"Seventeen", by Jimmy Eat World from Static Prevails
"Seventeen", by Let Loose from Let Loose
"Seventeen", by Machinae Supremacy from Redeemer
"Seventeen", by Rich Brian
"Seventeen", by Sex Pistols from Never Mind the Bollocks, Here's the Sex Pistols
"Seventeen", by Sharon Van Etten from Remind Me Tomorrow
"Seventeen", by Troye Sivan from Bloom
"Seventeen", by X Marks the Pedwalk from Inner Zone Journey
"Seventeen", from Repo! The Genetic Opera
"Seventeen", a song from Heathers: The Musical
"Seventeen", a song by Tyler Braden which represented Tennessee in the American Song Contest

Performers
The17, a UK choir
Seventeen (South Korean band), a South Korean boy group
Seventeen (Indonesian band), a former Indonesian band group
Seventeen, a UK band that later became The Alarm

Vehicles and transportation
USS Carnelian (PY-19), a 1930 converted yacht originally named Seventeen
Lockheed X-17, an American experimental rocket

Aircraft
Beechcraft 17, an American light transport
Boeing B-17 Flying Fortress, an American WW2 bomber
Boeing C-17 Globemaster III, an American cargo plane
Bréguet 17, a French WW1 fighter
Consolidated 17, an American light airliner
Dornier 17, a German WW1 bomber
FBA 17, a French 1920s flying boat
Ki-17, a Japanese WW2 trainer
Latécoère 17, a French 1920s airliner
Mi-17, a Soviet helicopter
MiG 17, a Soviet jet fighter
Nieuport 17, a French WW1 fighter
Northrop YF-17 Cobra, an American prototype fighter jet
Potez 17, a French reconnaissance aircraft
Saab 17, a Swedish WW2 light bomber
SPAD XVII, a French WW1 fighter
Yak-17, a Soviet jet fighter

Other uses
Seventeen, Ohio, an American unincorporated community in Tuscarawas County
17 (app), a photo and video app for Android and iOS

See also

List of highways numbered 17

117 (disambiguation)
B17 (disambiguation)
C17 (disambiguation)
Class 17 (disambiguation)
F17 (disambiguation)
M17 (disambiguation)
Model 17 (disambiguation)
T17 (disambiguation)
Type 17 (disambiguation)